The football (soccer) Campeonato Brasileiro Série B 1996, the second level of Brazilian National League, was played from August 8 to December 8, 1996. The competition had 25 clubs and two of them were promoted to Série A and three were to be relegated to Série C. The competition was won by União São João.

União São João finished the final phase group with the most points, and was declared 1996 Brazilian Série B champions, claiming the promotion to the 1997 Série A along with América-RN, the runners-up. The three worst ranked teams (Goiatuba, Sergipe and Central) were originally relegated to play Série C in 1997. However, with the cancellation of the relegations of Fluminense and Bragantino in the Série A, the three teams were kept in the Série B for 1997.

Teams

First phase

Group A

Group B

Group C

Group D

Group E

Second phase

|}

Quarterfinals

|}

Final phase

Final standings

Sources

Campeonato Brasileiro Série B seasons
1996 in Brazilian football leagues